Dooby Duck's Disco Bus is a children's puppet show presented by Dooby Duck (created by Alan Hausrath and Harry Stuart), a puppet duck with a shiny showbiz jacket and a pink bow-tie, who introduced puppets singing contemporary songs of the day. Dooby signed off each show laughing and saying 'Dooby Dooby Dooby Dooby Dooby Quack Quack'. The character first appeared as a segment on the children's sketch programme 'The Satellite Show'.

Series guide 

 Dooby Duck's Disco Bus 13 editions. Broadcast 5 January 1989 – 30 March 1989
 Dooby's Duck Truck 13 editions. Broadcast 3 January 1991 – 28 March 1991
 Dooby Duck's Euro Tour 13 editions. Broadcast 30 September 1992 – 23 December 1992

All series were given repeat airings

References

External links 
 
 BFI database entry for Dooby Duck's Disco Bus

1989 British television series debuts
1992 British television series endings
BBC children's television shows
Television series about ducks
British television shows featuring puppetry
1980s British children's television series
1990s British children's television series
English-language television shows